Langendreer is the most populous district of the city of Bochum in the Ruhr area in Germany. Langendreer is between Dortmund, the largest city of Westphalia and Langendreer-Alter Bahnhof, another district of Bochum. Langendreeer includes Kaltehardt, a mainly residential area. Langendreer is in the East of Bochum. Bochum-Langendreer station is one of the largest railway stations in Bochum and the district is also served by Bochum-Langendreer West station. Langendreer used to be one of the main centers of the East Prussian minority in Western Germany.

In the early 20th century coal mining and steel manufacturing were the primary employers in Langendreer.

Langendreer-Alter Bahnhof is a statistical district of the city of Bochum. Langendreer-Alter Bahnhof is in the east side of the city, between Bochum-Querenburg and Bochum-Werne.

Langendreer-Alter Bahnhof is south of the main Autobahn of the Ruhr, A 40.

Notable people
Bastian Pastewka, German actor and comedian
Paul Nieder-Westermann, Nazi official
Fritz Katzmann, SS-Gruppenführer and war criminal

External links
http://www.langendreer-info.de
http://www.heimatstube-langendreer.de

Boroughs of Bochum